Clostera powelli is a moth of the  family Notodontidae. It is found in North Africa, more specifically in Morocco and Algeria.

The wingspan is 13–15 mm. The moth flies from April to October in two generations depending on the location.

The larvae feed on Populus and Salix species.

Sources 
 P.C.-Rougeot, P. Viette (1978). Guide des papillons nocturnes d'Europe et d'Afrique du Nord. Delachaux et Niestlé (Lausanne).

Notodontidae